The Grand Rapids Chicks were a women's professional baseball team based in Grand Rapids, Michigan. They played in the All-American Girls Professional Baseball League from 1945 to 1954, winning championships in 1947 and 1953.

History
The franchise originated in 1944 in Milwaukee, Wisconsin as the Milwaukee Chicks. Although the Chicks won the 1944 AAGPBL championship, they could not compete with the minor league Milwaukee Brewers for ticket sales, and the franchise moved to Grand Rapids. They enjoyed continued success following the move, making the playoffs every year until the league folded following the 1954 season.

Grand Rapids had its share of league stars including Players of the Year Connie Wisniewski in 1945 and Alma Ziegler in 1950.  League pitching titles were won by Chicks pitchers in 1944 and 1945 by Wisniewski, Mildred Earp in 1947, Alice Haylett in 1948, and Ziegler in 1950.  Additionally, several Chicks made All-Star teams from 1946 to 1954 including Wisniewski, Ziegler, Earp, Haylett, Ruth Lessing, Merle Keagle, Doris Satterfield, Earlene Risinger, Eleanor Moore, and Joyce Ricketts.

The Chicks played their home games at South High School in Grand Rapids, with the exception of 1950-1952 when games were played at Bigelow Field in Wyoming Township.  After a fire destroyed Bigelow Field, the Chicks returned to South High School through 1954.

All-time players roster
Bold denotes members of the inaugural roster

 Evelyn Adams
 Isabel Alvarez
 Lois Barker
 Charlene Barnett
 Edith Barney
Betty Bays
 Mary Lou Beschorner
 Jaynne Bittner
 Kay Blumetta
Mary Butcher
Thelma Childress
 Louise Clapp 
 Donna Cook
 Patricia Courtney
 Jeanie Descombes
 Mildred Earp
 Thelma Eisen
 Lorraine Fisher
 Anita Foss
 Rose Gacioch
 Eileen Gascon
 Barbara Gates
 Jean Geissinger
 Philomena Gianfrancisco
 Annie Gosbee
 Thelma Grambo
 Audrey Haine
 Julia Hardin
 Josephine Hasham
 Alice Haylett
 Katherine Herring
 Joyce Hill
 Joan Holderness
 Margaret Holgerson
 Dorothy Hunter
 Frances Janssen
 Joan Jaykoski
 Marilyn Jenkins
 Josephine Kabick
 Merle Keagle
 Phyllis Koehn
 Jaynie Krick
 Karen Kunkel
 Beverly Leach
 Annabelle Lee
 Joan LeQuia
 Ruth Lessing
 Kay Lionikas
 Dorothy Maguire
 Ruth Mason
 Joyce Messinger
 Dorothy Montgomery
 Dolores Moore
 Eleanor Moore
 Dorothy Mueller
 Doris Neal
 Dolly Niemiec
 Marilyn Olinger
 Lavonne Paire
 Shirley Palesh
 Marguerite Pearson
 Katherine Pechulis
 Ernestine Petras
 Betty Petryna
 Magdalen Redman
 Dorice Reid
 Ruth Richard
 Joyce Ricketts
 Earlene Risinger
 Mary Rountree
 Doris Satterfield
 Gloria Schweigerdt
 Twila Shively
 Frances Sloan
 Colleen Smith
 Helen Smith
 Jean Smith
 Marjean Smith
 Barbara Sowers
 Rosemary Stevenson
 Jane Stoll
 Dorothy Stolze
 Ruby Stoykovich
 Mary Lou Studnicka
 Shirley Sutherland
 Mary Lou Swanagon
 Yolande Teillet
 Barbara Tetro
 Doris Tetzlaff
 Viola Thompson
 Ina Dell Towers
 Betty Tucker
 Joan Tysver
 Karen Violetta
 Inez Voyce
 Betty Wanless
 Marie Wegman
 Margaret Wenzell
 Vera Whiteman
 Betty Whiting
 Elizabeth Wicken
 Elsie Wingrove
 Connie Wisniewski
 Sylvia Wronski
 Renae Youngberg
 Marie Zeigler
 Alma Ziegler

Managers

Season-by-season records
 1945: 60-50
 1946: 71-41
 1947: 65-47 *
 1948: 77-47
 1949: 57-54
 1950: 59-53
 1951: 71-35
 1952: 50-60
 1953: 62-44 *
 1954: 46-45
    * Championship season

References

Sources
 All-American Girls Professional Baseball League history
 All-American Girls Professional Baseball League official website – Grand Rapids Chicks seasons
 All-American Girls Professional Baseball League official website – Manager/Player profile search results
 Michigan History Magazine – Grand Rapids Chicks article
 All-American Girls Professional Baseball League Record Book – W. C. Madden. Publisher: McFarland & Company, 2000. Format: Hardcover, 294pp. Language: English. 
 The Women of the All-American Girls Professional Baseball League: A Biographical Dictionary – W. C. Madden. Publisher:  McFarland & Company, 2005. Format: Softcover, 295 pp. Language: English. 

All-American Girls Professional Baseball League teams
1945 establishments in Michigan
1954 disestablishments in Michigan
Baseball teams established in 1945
Baseball teams disestablished in 1954
Sports in Grand Rapids, Michigan
Defunct baseball teams in Michigan
Women's sports in Michigan